Daisy Irani is an Indian television actress, director and producer from Singapore.

Biography
She was born to Gujarati film actress Padmarani and stage director Namdar Irani in Bombay, India. She is best known for appearing in the role of Daisy in the popular Singapore TV series Under One Roof. She became the executive producer for MediaCorp Studio's English Entertainment Productions Division. Since 1 June 2007, she has been the head of MediaCorp TV12 Central Programming and Promotions, as well as MediaCorp TV12 Creative Services Division. On 19 October 2008, Kid's Central and Arts Central were merged to form Okto, while Vasantham Central became a full-fledged channel as MediaCorp Vasantham, occupying the original Central channel and effectively making the channel defunct.

She moved from Mumbai to Singapore in 1991 when her husband, Subin Subaiah, was posted there for work.

References

External links
 

Singaporean television actresses
Actresses from Mumbai
Living people
Indian emigrants to Singapore
Indian women television producers
Indian television producers
Year of birth missing (living people)
Irani people
Women television producers